The Romanian Plain is located in southern Romania and the easternmost tip of Serbia, where it is known as the Wallachian Plain. Bucharest, the capital of Romania, is located in the central part of the Romanian Plain. It is contiguous to the south with the Danubian Plain, in Bulgaria. This area is also sometimes referred to as the Danubian Plain (Câmpia Dunării) in Romanian, though this designation is not specific, because the Danube flows through a number of plains along its course, such as the Hungarian Plain (which is called the Danubian Plain in Slovakia and Serbia), as well as the Bavarian Lowland, also called the Danubian Plain.

Subdivisions
In Romania, the plain is divided into five subdivisions and the Danube Valley, which are, from West to East:
A. Oltenia Plain, located in southern Oltenia:

Băilești Plain
Romanați Plain
B. Olt-Argeș Plain (between the Olt River in the west and the Argeș River in the east):
Pitești Plain

C. București Plain:
Târgoviște Plain
Ploiești Plain
Mizil Plain
Titu Plain
Gherghița Plain
Vlăsia Plain
Câlnău Plain
D. Bărăgan Plain:
Bărăgan of Călmățui Plain
Bărăgan of Ialomița Plain
Mostiștea Plain
Hagieni Plain
E. The Eastern Plain:
Râmnic Plain
Buzău Plain
Brăila Plain
Lower Siret Plain
Tecuci Plain
Covurlui Plain
Danube Valley:
The Danube valley floodplain
Flooded marshy islands:
Insula Mare a Brăilei
Insula Mică a Brăilei
Balta Ialomiței

Rivers
 Neajlov
 Jiu
 Olt
 Vedea
 Argeș
 Dâmbovița
 Mostiștea
 Ialomița
 Buzău

Gallery

See also
 Focșani Gate
 Geography of Romania
 Danubian Plain

References

Plains of Romania
Plains of Serbia
Plain
Physiographic provinces